is the 26th single by the Japanese girl idol group Berryz Kobo. It was released in Japan on June 8, 2011, and debuted at number 11 on the Oricon weekly CD singles chart.

Track listings

CD single 
 
 
 "Ai no Dangan" (Instrumental)

 Limited Edition A DVD
 "Ai no Dangan" (Dance Shot Ver.)
 
 Limited Edition B DVD
 "Ai no Dangan" (Close-up Ver.)

DVD single Single V "Ai no Dangan" 
 "Ai no Dangan"
 "Ai no Dangan" (Another Dance Shot Ver.)

DVD single Event V "Ai no Dangan" 
 "Ai no Dangan" (Shimizu Saki Close-up Ver.)
 "Ai no Dangan" (Tsugunaga Momoko Close-up Ver.)
 "Ai no Dangan" (Tokunaga Chinami Close-up Ver.)
 "Ai no Dangan" (Sudo Maasa Close-up Ver.)
 "Ai no Dangan" (Natsuyaki Miyabi Close-up Ver.)
 "Ai no Dangan" (Kumai Yurina Close-up Ver.)
 "Ai no Dangan" (Sugaya Risako Close-up Ver.)

Charts

CD single

DVD single Single V "Ai no Dangan"

References

External links 
 Profile on the Up-Front Works official website
 Profile of the corresponding DVD single on the Up-Front Works official website

2011 singles
2011 songs
Japanese-language songs
Berryz Kobo songs
Songs written by Tsunku
Piccolo Town singles
Song recordings produced by Tsunku